"Finer Feelings" is a song by Australian singer Kylie Minogue. It was the final release from Let's Get to It and was planned as the follow-up to "Word Is Out", but it was held back after the release of "If You Were with Me Now". "Finer Feelings" finally appeared in April 1992, remixed by Brothers in Rhythm (whom Minogue would continue collaborating with throughout the 1990s, and continued with Steve Anderson into the present), and narrowly missed out on the top 10, peaking at number 11 on the UK charts.

In Australia, "Finer Feelings" reached number 60 on the ARIA Singles Chart for the week ending 5 July 1992. Excluding a re-release of "Better the Devil You Know" in 1998, "Finer Feelings" was Minogue's only single to miss the top 50 in Australia until "Get Outta My Way", which peaked at number 69 in 2010. "Finer Feelings" remains a fan favourite, and Minogue has performed excerpts of the song during several of her tours. 

The song's B-side, "Closer", is different from the song of the same title that would appear on her 2010 album Aphrodite. "Finer Feelings" was re-recorded in 2011 and posted onto Kylie Minogue's official YouTube channel on 25 January 2012. It is featured on The Abbey Road Sessions.

Critical reception
Brittany Porter from AXS listed the track as one of her five most underrated songs. Writing for Digital Spy, Nick Levine called it a "hidden gem" and stated: "At least five tunes are in contention, 'Finer Feelings' sneaks it for showing that Kylie could be sexier and more sophisticated than ever before without skimping on the chorus." Music Week stated that it is Minogue "at her most mature and reflective", and added that "percussive and rhythmic accentuation are subtle rather than florid, and Kylie's vocal is amongst her best. Sweetly melancholic, and if she does now move on from PWL, it's a fine note to leave on".

Music video
The music video was once again directed by Dave Hogan (who previously worked with Minogue on "What Do I Have to Do?" and "Shocked") and shot entirely in Paris with a 1930s/40s feel.

Formats and track listings
CD single
 "Finer Feelings" (Brothers in Rhythm 7-inch mix) – 3:47
 "Finer Feelings" (Brothers in Rhythm 12-inch mix) – 6:47
 "Finer Feelings" (original mix/album version) – 3:55
 "Closer" (The Pleasure Mix)

7-inch and cassette single
 "Finer Feelings" (Brothers in Rhythm 7-inch mix) – 3:47
 "Closer" (edit)

12-inch single
 "Finer Feelings" (Brothers in Rhythm 12" mix) – 6:47
 "Closer" (The Pleasure Mix)

Charts

References

Kylie Minogue songs
1991 songs
1992 singles
Black-and-white music videos
Pete Waterman Entertainment singles
Songs written by Mike Stock (musician)
Songs written by Pete Waterman